In Mandaeism, the klila is a small myrtle (asa) wreath or ring (translated as "circlet" by E. S. Drower) used during Mandaean religious rituals. The klila is a female symbol that complements the taga, a white crown which always takes on masculine symbolism.

The klila is used to adorn the drabsha, a wooden cross covered with a white cloth that is the main symbol of Mandaeism.

Use in rituals
The klila is used during most Mandaean rituals, including masbuta, masiqta, and priest initiation rituals.

In the Qolasta

Several prayers in the Qolasta are recited when consecrating and putting on the klila, including prayers 19, 46, 47, 61, and 79.

In E. S. Drower's version of the Qolasta, prayers 305-329 are recited for the klila, as well as for the taga.

See also
Drabsha
Laurel wreath
Olive wreath

References

External links
Preparing the klila: cutting myrtle (video)

Mandaean religious objects
Symbols of Abrahamic religions
Mandaic words and phrases
Plants in culture
Myrtus